Loktantrik Bahujan Samaj Party (Democratic Majority Society Party), splinter group of Bahujan Samaj Party formed in September 2003 when 37 Members of the Legislative Assembly of Uttar Pradesh broke away. The party leader was Haji Yakub. In October the same year LBSP merged with the Samajwadi Party.

The formation of LBSP was a way to avoid sanction under the Anti-Defection Law, and thus LBSP was in many ways a transitional pseudo-party (like Democratic Congress Party, etc.).

Defunct political parties in Uttar Pradesh
Political parties established in 2003
Political parties disestablished in 2003
2003 establishments in Uttar Pradesh
Bahujan Samaj Party